Potato aucuba mosaic virus (PAMV) is a plant pathogenic virus of the family Alphaflexiviridae.

See also 

 Viral diseases of potato

External links
 
 ICTVdB - The Universal Virus Database: Potato aucuba mosaic virus
 Family Groups - The Baltimore Method

Potexviruses
Viral plant pathogens and diseases